HeeksCAD is a free software computer-aided design program written in C++. It uses Open CASCADE Technology internally for the modelling and wxWidgets as its widget toolkit.

HeeksCAD supports cuboids, spheres, cylinders and cones as basic 3D solids. Further geometric objects may be created by sweeping or connecting 2D shapes.

HeeksCAD makes extensive use of local coordinate systems. For example, these are used to define the drawing plane and the direction of an extrusion.

The program can be extended with additional plugins. Plugins are available for Python scripting, milling and freeform surface modelling.

See also 

 Comparison of CAD editors for AEC

References

Further reading 
 B. Collette, D. Falck, No Secrets: Open-source CAM Application Bares All, Digital Machinist Vol. 5 No. 3 Fall 2010

External links
 

Free computer-aided design software
Free software programmed in C++
Computer-aided design software for Linux
Software using the BSD license
Software that uses wxWidgets